Masciotta is a surname. Notable people with the surname include:

Aldo Masciotta (1909–1996), Italian fencer
Edelfa Chiara Masciotta (born 1984), Italian television personality and former beauty pageant titleholder 
Giovanna Masciotta (born 1942), Italian fencer

Italian-language surnames